This page is a list of New Zealand poets.

A–E

F–M

N–Z

See also

New Zealand literature
List of New Zealand writers

External links 
Poetry New Zealand magazine
The New Zealand Poetry Society
Poetry Archive of New Zealand Aotearoa (PANZA) by Michael O'Leary

References

Lists of poets by nationality
Poets